Wilhelm "Willy" Kment (1914 – 22 December 2002) was an Austrian football player and manager.

He played for Landstraßer AC, DSV Brünn and Wiener Sport-Club.

While coaching Drafn, Drammen in Norway, he worked in Drammen Skifabrikk, alongside olympic gold medalist skijumper Birger Ruud.

He coached VVV-Venlo, Norway, Feyenoord, LASK Linz and Fredrikstad.

References

External links

1914 births
2002 deaths
Austrian footballers
Austrian football managers
Austrian expatriate football managers
VVV-Venlo managers
Norway national football team managers
Feyenoord managers
LASK managers
Fredrikstad FK managers
Expatriate football managers in the Netherlands
Expatriate football managers in Norway
VV DOS managers
Association football midfielders